
Year 604 (DCIV) was a leap year starting on Wednesday (link will display the full calendar) of the Julian calendar. The denomination 604 for this year has been used since the early medieval period, when the Anno Domini calendar era became the prevalent method in Europe for naming years.

Events 
 By place 

 Byzantine Empire 
 The Avars regroup after they are almost destroyed; together with the Slavs they start pillaging through the Byzantine provinces, west and south of the Danube. Due to the new Persian war, Emperor Phocas has few imperial troops available to defend the Balkan Peninsula.
 Byzantine–Persian War: King Khosrau II captures the Byzantine positions east of the Euphrates; the Persians destroy many cities in the Levant region, after prolonged sieges such as the Byzantine fortress of Dara (modern Turkey).

 Europe 
 Queen Brunhilda of Austrasia conspires to have Berthoald, Mayor of the Palace, assassinated. She convinces King Theuderic II to send him to inspect the royal villae along the Seine. Brunhilda then has the noblemen who actually carried out the murder arrested and killed.
 December 25 – Battle of Ėtampes: Theuderic II, with the aid of Berthoald, defeats the Frankish forces under King Chlothar II of Neustria, at Étampes (near Paris).

 Britain 
 Æthelfrith of Northumbria invades Deira and kills its king, Æthelric. Prince Edwin, son of the late king Ælla of Deira (possibly a nephew of Æthelric), flees to the court of King Iago of Gwynedd (northwest Wales).
 Sæbert succeeds his father Sledd as king of Essex. He is persuaded to convert to Christianity through the intervention of his uncle, King Æthelberht of Kent.

 Asia 
 August 13 – Emperor Wéndi, age 63, is assassinated by his son Yángdi, after a 23-year reign in which he has attacked hereditary privilege and reduced the power of the military aristocracy. He is succeeded by Yángdi, who becomes the second emperor of the Sui Dynasty.
 Prince Shotoku, imperial regent of Empress Suiko, issues a Seventeen-article constitution, based on both Confucian and Buddhist principles in Japan.

 By topic 

 Religion 
 March 12 – Pope Gregory I (the Great) dies at Rome, after a 14-year reign. He has laid the foundations which claim papal absolutism, pioneered the conversion of Britain to Roman Catholicism and enunciated what will come to be known as the "seven deadly sins". Gregory is succeeded by Sabinian as the 65th pope of the Catholic Church.
 May 26 – Augustine, Archbishop of Canterbury, is succeeded by Laurence. He is a member of the Gregorian mission (see 596).
 Æthelberht of Kent founds St. Paul's Cathedral. Mellitus is appointed the first Saxon bishop of London (and Essex).
 The See of Rochester is established, and Justus is appointed as bishop. He founds Rochester Cathedral (Kent).

Births 
 Oswald, king (bretwalda) of Northumbria (approximate date)

Deaths 
 March 12 – Gregory I, pope of the Catholic Church
 May 26 – Augustine, Archbishop of Canterbury (approximate date)
 August 13 – Emperor Wen of Sui, emperor of the Sui Dynasty (b. 541)
 November 4 – Yohl Ik'nal, female ruler of Palenque (Mexico)
 December 16 – Houzhu, emperor of the Chen Dynasty (b. 553)
 Æthelric, king of Deira (approximate date)
 Berthoald, Mayor of the Palace (Burgundy) 
 Colmán Rímid, High King of Ireland
 Sledd, king of Essex (approximate date)
 Xiao Mohe, general of the Sui Dynasty (b. 532)
 Yang Yong, prince of the Sui Dynasty

References